The Parish Church, Kirkby Stephen is an Anglican parish church in Kirkby Stephen, Cumbria. 
The Church is Shared between the Anglican and Roman Catholic Population of Kirkby Stephen, holding both Anglican Communion and Roman Catholic Mass.

History

Kirkby Stephen Parish Church is often called the "Cathedral of the Dales" and, in Cumbria, only Kendal Parish Church is larger. There have been three churches on this site. The first was built in Anglo-Saxon times; it was replaced in 1170 by a Norman church. This was replaced by the present building in 1240 and has been altered in the centuries since, being partly rebuilt in 1847 and restored in the 1870s. It is a Grade II* listed building.

The church is approached from the market square, where it is almost hidden from view by the cloisters, built in 1810.

The Church has no official dedication. There is no factual basis to support either reference to St Stephen or to the other rumoured previous dedication to St John. However, the church is often referred to as 'St Stephen's Church', with reference to the place-name of Kirkby Stephen.

The Church has a ring of 8 bells, with the tenor weighing 15 cwt and tuned to F; all except the 7th bell were cast by John Warner & Sons of London in 1877, the 7th was cast by Edward Seller in 1849.

Parish

The church is in a joint parish with: 
St Andrew's Church, Crosby Garrett
St Mary's Church, Mallerstang 
The Parish Church is also the home of the Roman Catholic congregation, following an official sharing agreement entered into in 1990.

Memorials

The north or Wharton chapel has a late sixteenth-century altar tomb with effigies of Thomas Wharton, 1st Baron Wharton (1495-1568) and his 2 wives.

The south or Hartley chapel has an early fifteenth-century altar tomb with an effigy of Sir Richard Musgrave (died 1409), and a fifteenth-century altar tomb to Sir Richard Musgrave (died 1464). It is dedicated to St Paul.

The most important monument in the church is a relief of the Norse god Loki, who is shown bound and chained (pictures above). It was part of an Anglo-Saxon cross shaft.

Organ

The church contains a three manual pipe organ dating from 1888. A specification of the organ can be found on the National Pipe Organ Register.

See also

Grade II* listed buildings in Eden District
Listed buildings in Kirkby Stephen

References

Church of England church buildings in Cumbria
Grade II* listed churches in Cumbria
St Stephen's Church